Brian Vincent Boudreau (July 19, 1954 – October 12, 2021) was a Canadian politician. He represented the electoral district of Cape Breton The Lakes in the Nova Scotia House of Assembly from 1999 to 2003. He was a member of the Nova Scotia Liberal Party.

Early life and municipal politics
Born in 1954 at Bras d'Or, Nova Scotia, Boudreau served as a municipal councilor in Cape Breton County. In 1995, following municipal amalgamation, Boudreau was elected to council for the newly formed Cape Breton Regional Municipality, where he served as deputy mayor.

Provincial politics
Boudreau entered provincial politics in the 1999 election, defeating New Democrat incumbent Helen MacDonald by 101 votes in the Cape Breton The Lakes riding.

In 2002, Boudreau's riding was eliminated following redistribution and he announced his intention to seek the Liberal nomination in the new Victoria-The Lakes riding. On March 29, 2003, Boudreau was defeated for the nomination by Victoria County Warden Gerald Sampson. On April 2, Boudreau quit the Liberal caucus to sit as an independent. On April 14, Boudreau announced that he would seek re-election in the 2003 election, running as an independent candidate in Victoria-The Lakes. On election night, Sampson won the seat, defeating Progressive Conservative Keith Bain by 248 votes, with Boudreau finishing fourth. He died on October 12, 2021 at the age of 67.

References

1954 births
2021 deaths
Nova Scotia Liberal Party MLAs
Nova Scotia Independent MLAs
Nova Scotia municipal councillors
People from the Cape Breton Regional Municipality
21st-century Canadian politicians
Acadian people